"Plug Walk" is a hip-hop song by American rapper Rich the Kid, released as the second single to his debut album The World Is Yours. The song, produced by The Lab Cook, was premiered through Zane Lowe's Beats 1 radio program on February 9, 2018. The song remains Rich the Kid's highest-charting song to date, having reached number 13 on the Billboard Hot 100.

Music video
A music video for the song, directed by DAPS, was released on March 4, 2018. The video pays homage to the television show Breaking Bad and features Rich the Kid cooking up chemicals in an RV with an alien also known as lil Mayo in the middle of the desert. Since its release the music video has received over 280 million views on YouTube as of April 2020.

Remixes
On April 3, 2018, an unofficial remix was released by rappers Jadakiss and Nino Man. Another unofficial remix was released by rapper 6ix9ine called "Blood Walk". Four weeks prior to the remix being released, Rich posted a picture on his Instagram account teasing the official album cover for the official remix. The official remix featuring rappers Gucci Mane, YG, and 2 Chainz was then released on June 20, 2018. German rapper Ufo361 was also featured on a remix of the song.

Charts

Weekly charts

Year-end charts

Certifications

Release history

References

2018 singles
2018 songs
Rich the Kid songs
Songs written by Rich the Kid
Interscope Records singles